Great Crossing is an unincorporated community located in Scott County, Kentucky, United States.

Geography

Great Crossing is located in west-central Scott County at 38°12'56.1"N 84°36'21.1"W and is part of the Lexington-Fayette metropolitan area.

Kentucky Route 227 bisects the center of the community, and U.S. Route 460 passes south of the community center.

Elkhorn Creek, an 18 mile long navigable waterway, bisects the community.

Climate

The climate in this area is characterized by hot, humid summers and generally mild to cool winters. According to the Köppen Climate Classification system, Great Crossing has a humid subtropical climate, abbreviated "Cfa" on climate maps.

History

Great Crossing was founded in 1783 by Robert Johnson. The location was centered around a shallow area where bison had crossed the Elkhorn Creek. The community was also known as Johnson's Station, Great Buffalo Crossing, The Great Crossing and The Crossing. A post office operated in the community from 1811 to 1905.

See also 
 Great Crossing High School, a school in nearby Georgetown that opened in 2019 and is indirectly named for the community

References

Unincorporated communities in Scott County, Kentucky
Unincorporated communities in Kentucky